The Loei River is the one of tributaries of the Mekong River. It originates at the western shore of the Phu Luang plateau, at first flowing southwards. Changing to an eastward direction it becomes the boundary between Loei and Phetchabun Province, encircles the Phu Ho mountain and then flows northwards across the town Loei until it and mouths to the Mekong River in Na Sao Subdistrict, Chiang Khan District.

Rivers of Thailand
Tributaries of the Mekong River